The brother spike (Elliptio fraterna) is a species of freshwater mussel the family Unionidae, the river mussels. This species is endemic to the Savannah River, United States.   It listed as "endangered "in 1996 and was changed due to insufficient information and it has a world listing of "critically imperilled/imperilled".

References

Molluscs of the United States
Elliptio
Bivalves described in 1852
Taxonomy articles created by Polbot